Urochondra is a genus of plants in the grass family. The only known species is Urochondra setulosa, native to northeastern Africa (Djibouti, Eritrea, Sudan, Somalia, Socotra) and southwestern Asia (Saudi Arabia, Oman, Yemen, northwestern India, and Sindh Province in Pakistan). The species grows in coastal sand dunes, salt marshes and estuaries.

References

External links 
Grassbase - The World Online Grass Flora

Chloridoideae
Monotypic Poaceae genera
Taxa named by Charles Edward Hubbard